Kenneth Paul Bergquist Jr. (born 1944) is an American brigadier general. He served as the United States Assistant Secretary of the Navy (Manpower and Reserve Affairs) from 1988 to 1989.

Biography

Bergquist was born in Washington, D.C. on July 12, 1944, while his father Kenneth Bergquist Sr. was serving in the United States Army Air Forces during World War II.  He attended the Phillips Academy until March 1960 before transferring to Concord High School, graduating in 1962.  He then attended the United States Naval Academy for two years before transferring to Stanford University, graduating with a B.A. in 1967.

Upon graduation, Bergquist joined the United States Army and served in the army until 1974.  For two of his years in the army, he saw action in the Vietnam War in Vietnam and Cambodia.  For his combat service, he was awarded the Silver Star, six Bronze Stars and two Purple Hearts.

Bergquist left the army in 1974, but remained a member of the United States Army Reserve.  Starting in 1974, Bergquist attended the University of Texas School of Law, receiving his J.D. in 1977.

After law school, Bergquist joined the Central Intelligence Agency as an intelligence officer and paramilitary officer.  He then joined the staff of United States Senator Alan K. Simpson (R—Wyoming) as Legislative Counsel.  He next became Chief Counsel and Staff Director of the United States Senate Committee on Veterans' Affairs.

In 1983, Bergquist became deputy assistant secretary for readiness, force management and training at the United States Department of the Army.  In 1986, he became deputy assistant attorney general in the United States Department of Justice's Office of Legislative Affairs.

On June 9, 1987, President of the United States Ronald Reagan announced the nomination of Bergquist as Assistant Secretary of Defense (Special Operations and Low Intensity Conflict).  Less than a year later, President Reagan nominated Bergquist as Assistant Secretary of the Navy (Manpower and Reserve Affairs), and Bergquist subsequently held this office from June 1988 until November 1989.

He later served as Associate Coordinator for Counterterrorism.

In 2001, at the request of the Chairman of the Joint Chiefs of Staff and the commander of the United States Special Operations Command (General Charles R. Holland), Bergquist was recalled to active duty with the rank of brigadier general in order to become the first president of the new Joint Special Operations University, set up to educate intermediate and senior personnel of the Special Operations Forces and senior personnel in the Joint Special Operations Command.

In the wake of the September 11 attacks, Bergquist was assigned to United States Central Command as special operations staff director for Operation Enduring Freedom.  In this capacity, he oversaw Unconventional Warfare and Special Operations during the War in Afghanistan.

Bergquist retired from active duty in July 2002 and has been an independent crisis management and risk mitigation consultant and has been affiliated with a number of companies.  Bergquist has been responsible for managing the execution of approximately $100 million of various security and national security related projects in both the Middle East and in the United States.  Bergquist is currently associated with Jankel Tactical Systems of the United Kingdom.

References

 Press Release on Announcement of Bergquist's Appointment as an Assistant Secretary of Defense
 Profile from Maritime Security Institute

1944 births
Living people
Phillips Academy alumni
Concord-Carlisle High School alumni
United States Naval Academy alumni
Stanford University alumni
United States Army personnel of the Vietnam War
Recipients of the Silver Star
United States Army reservists
University of Texas School of Law alumni
United States Assistant Secretaries of the Navy
United States Army generals